Bertin Jacquesson (born 30 November 2001) is a French professional footballer who plays for Major League Soccer side Real Salt Lake as a forward.

Early life
Jacquesson played as a youth player for RCP Fontainebleau before playing in Bretigny-sur-Org for SC Bretigny. He was prolific in the national under-17 level championships for Bretigny, scoring eighteen goals in twenty-three games. In December 2018 he was signed up by RC Strasbourg, where spent a year, before moving to SO Châtellerault.

Career

Pittsburgh Panthers
Playing in the US college system for the University of Pittsburgh soccer team the Pittsburgh Panthers, Jacquesson made an immediate impact in the autumn of 2020, starting matches as a freshman. He was named by Top Drawer Soccer as the Freshman of the Year for the 2020–21 season.

Overall he scored 19 goals, and provided 23 assists, in 61 appearances as Pitt made three consecutive Elite Eight appearances and two College Cups between 2020–22. Ahead of the MLS SuperDraft in December 2022 Jacquesson signed a Generation Adidas contract with the league.

Real Salt Lake
Jacquesson was drafted in the first round of the SuperDraft at number sixteen by Real Salt Lake.

Personal life
As a Muslim, Jacquesson has at times had to balance his soccer career with observing Ramadan.

References

External links

Living people
Pittsburgh Panthers men's soccer players
French footballers
French expatriate footballers
RC Strasbourg Alsace players
Real Salt Lake players
Expatriate soccer players in the United States
Association football forwards
Major League Soccer players
Real Salt Lake draft picks
2001 births